Gibberula ramsi is a species of very small sea snail, a marine gastropod micromollusk in the family Cystiscidae.

References

Cystiscidae
Gastropods described in 2007